

Holyhead services

The London and North Western Railway operated a number of ships on Irish Sea crossings between Holyhead and Dublin, Howth or Kingstown.

Fleetwood services

The LNWR also operated a joint service with the Lancashire & Yorkshire Railway from Fleetwood to Belfast and Derry.

References

London and North Western Railway
 
Steamships of the United Kingdom
Merchant ships of the United Kingdom
Lists of ships of the United Kingdom
London And North Western Railway Ships